was one of the most prominent Japanese photographers in the first half of the 20th century in Japan.

In 1932, Horino published a monograph  which is one of the most important works for Japanese modern photography (Shinkō Shashin). This monograph consists of photographs of ships and architectures made of steel, such as bridges, tanks and towers, based on his own sense of beauty, derived directly from the theories of the art critic (photo critic) , using, for example, close-up and looking-up.  Therefore, this work can be regarded as a collaboration between Horino and Itagaki.  This work is as important as the monograph Métal by Germaine Krull in terms of the beauty of machinery.

Further, Horino published his work of documentary photography using montage technique in some magazines, such as the Character of Great Tokyo (Dai Tokyo no Seikaku, . 1931, editing and design by Takaho Itagaki, Chūōkōron October issue) and Flowing through the City - Sumida River Album (Shutokanryū - Sumida-gawa no Arubamu, 1931, editing and design by Tomoyoshi Murayama, Hanzai Kagaku December issue).  No other photographer made such high-level documentary photographs before World War II.

Horino was one very important example of the earliest photographers to have a professional mind, like Yōnosuke Natori, although in Japan before World War II, most photographers were amateurs and took pictures only for their own inside world, not for the outside world.

In Europe and America the effects of the atomic bombs over Hiroshima and Nagasaki were not fully understood. The photos produced by Masao Horino contributed to the world wide cry for the bombs to never be used again.

After World War II, he founded the company Minicum  manufacturing electronic flashguns for cameras and was absorbed in managing his own company rather than taking photographs.

References 
Kaneko Ryūichi. Modern Photography in Japan 1915-1940. San Francisco: Friends of Photography, 2001. 
Tucker, Anne Wilkes, et al. The History of Japanese Photography. New Haven: Yale University Press, 2003. 
Camera, Me x Tetsu, Kosei (Camera, Eye x Iron, Construction),  Mokuseishashoin, 1932.  Facsimile edition: Tokyo: Kokushokankōkai, 2005.  The facsimile edition comes with short commentaries in both Japanese and English.
 Iizawa Kōtarō. Eyes for Cities, Japanese Photography in 1920s and 1930s (Toshi no Shisen, Nihon no Shashin 1920-30 nendai ). , 1989.
 Exhibition Catalogue for "Rhapsody of Modern Tokyo" (Modern Tokyo Kyoshi-kyoku ), 1993. (You can see all pages of "Character of Great Tokyo" and "Flowing through the City - Sumida River Album" in this catalogue, though the reproductions are small.)
(You can see all pages of Camera, Me x Tetsu, Kosei in this catalogue, though the reproductions are small.)
 . , vol. 9. , 1997. 

Japanese photographers
1907 births
1998 deaths
People from Tokyo
Tokyo Institute of Technology alumni